Ami Perrin (c. 1500 – 1561) was a Genevan leader of the "Libertins" party and one of the most powerful figures in Geneva in the 16th century as chief opponent of religious reformer John Calvin's rule of the city.

Perrin's father was a dealer in wooden vessels who later expanded into cloth retail and married the daughter of a thriving apothecary from Piedmont. Their only child, Ami, they fawned over and spoiled excessively. Perrin was associated with the Eidguenots, Geneva's anti-Savoyard party and in 1529 commanded a company against the Duke of Savoy. During the 1530s he was a partisan of Protestant reformist John Calvin, and a convinced "Guillermin", but considered himself poorly rewarded for this support. The Perrins were a prominent and wealthy Genevese family which strongly supported the independence of the city and invited Calvin back from Strasbourg in 1541. However, Perrin became disillusioned with Calvin's rule, specifically the large number of immigrants and foreign ministers, and was concerned that the Holy Roman Emperor, Charles V would capture the city as part of his campaign against the German princes. Perrin, who was at this point a man of great reputation and authority in Geneva, led the Libertine faction in the city which argued against Calvin's "insistence that church discipline should be enforced uniformly against all members of Genevan society". In 1547, Perrin was elected captain-general of the city's militia.

He married Françoise Favre, the daughter of François Favre, a merchant draper and former Eidguenot who was active on the Council and prosecuted in 1547 for accusing Calvin of proclaiming himself bishop of Geneva. Françoise appeared before the consistory (the congregation's governing body of elected officials) the same year, for the offence of dancing. Resisting the authority of Church elders, she claimed the right to punish her was reserved for her husband, Ami, who was in France representing the city before Henry II at the time. Returning to Geneva in September of that year, Perrin famously proclaimed before the court:

His petition was refused by the council, and he was accused of treason for allegedly offering to introduce a French garrison into Geneva to secure the city from attack by Charles V's troops in southern Germany. The subsequent lengthy trial and Perrin's acquittal and restoration to office reflected badly on the Calvinists. Perrin and his allies were elected to the town council in 1548, and "broadened their support base in Geneva by stirring up resentment among the older inhabitants against the increasing number of religious refugees who were fleeing France in even greater numbers". By 1555, Calvinists were firmly in place on the Genevan town council, so the Libertines, led by Perrin, responded with an attempted coup against the government and called for the massacre of the French. The revolt was unsuccessful as the forces of Calvin triumphed, and Perrin was sentenced in absentia to have his right hand cut off. In the words of historian Jonathan Zophy, Perrin's uprising was "the last great political challenge Calvin had to face in Geneva." Calvin would later describe Perrin as "our comic Caesar".

See also 
Reformation in Switzerland

Citations

16th-century people from the Republic of Geneva
Year of birth unknown
1561 deaths
Politicians from the Republic of Geneva
Year of birth uncertain